Human Beans is the album released by Earthlings?, which was released on August 8, 2000 through the record company Crippled Dick Hot Wax. The genre could be described as stoner rock or as desert rock.

Track listing
"Visionary Messenger" - 2:20
"Ground Control" - 3:48
"Piano Falls and Kills" - 4:19
"Lifeboat" - 3:51
"Rock Dove" - 5:30
"Johnny B. Goode" - 2:54
"Vegan Meth" - 9:11
"Moons Over Milleniums" - 3:19
"From Beyond Space Valley" - 2:23
"You Will Say" - 3:36
"Big Hairy Spider" - 3:56

Personnel
 Dave Catching – guitar
 Pete Stahl – vocals
 Fred Drake – bass
 Dave Grohl – drums on "Rock Dove"
 Josh Homme – vocals on "Visionary Messenger"

References

2000 albums
Earthlings? albums